This Means War may refer to:

Film and TV
 A repeated line in the Groucho Marx film Duck Soup
 A catchphrase of Bugs Bunny
 This Means War (film), a 2012 American action spy film starring Reese Witherspoon, Chris Pine, and Tom Hardy

Music

Albums
 This Means War (Attack Attack! album)
 This Means War!, an album by Petra
 This Means War (Tank album)

Songs
 "This Means War", a song by AC/DC on the album Blow Up Your Video
 "This Means War" (Avenged Sevenfold song)
 "This Means War" (Marianas Trench song)
 "This Means War" (Nickelback song)
 "This Means War," a song by Joan Jett from her album Good Music (1986) and the soundtrack for the film Light of Day (1987)
 "This Means War!!" (featuring Ozzy Osbourne), a song by Busta Rhymes from his album E.L.E. (Extinction Level Event): The Final World Front (1998)